The year 1506 in science and technology included many events, some of which are listed here.

Astronomy
 Possible date – Nicolaus Copernicus begins to write De revolutionibus orbium coelestium ("On the Revolution of the Heavenly Spheres"). He sends an abstract, the Commentariolus, to other scientists interested in the matter before 1514 and is considered to have finished De revolutionibus in 1530, but hesitates to publish before 1543, the year of his death.

Exploration
 Portuguese mariner Tristão da Cunha sights the islands of Tristan da Cunha.

Deaths
 May 20 – Christopher Columbus, Italian explorer (born 1451).

References

 
16th century in science
1500s in science